Ye Olde Tavern is a restaurant in Manchester Center, Vermont, US, that is listed on the Vermont Register of Historic Places. It was built by Aaron Sheldon from Dorset, Vermont, in 1790, making it the oldest inn in the state of Vermont. It was also one of the first buildings in Manchester to house telephone lines, and was once "the headquarters for the movement to license the sale of 'spirituous beverages'." It began as a tavern in 1790 called The Stagecoach Inn, before becoming Lockwood's Hotel circa 1850. In 1860, the building was renamed Thayer's Hotel by the new owner, Steven Thayer. It became the Fairview Hotel in 1902 and, in 1934, it was a hotel and antique shop run by the new owner Walter Clemons. In 1975, it was renamed Ye Olde Tavern by Peter and Susan Palmer, who renovated the place in time for the 1976 United States Bicentennial.

Mark and Diedre Radicioni became the proprietors of Ye Olde Tavern around 1993. They took it over after losing their Grabbers Restaurant in Manchester to a fire. During their time as proprietors, Ye Olde Tavern was named the 1996 Restaurant of the Year by the National Restaurant Academy in the "Most Outstanding Value" category.

Michael and Minna Brandt have been the proprietors of Ye Olde Tavern since November 2001. The restaurant has a colonial setting and Michael Brandt commented, "When people step into the Ye Olde Tavern, it's like stepping back in time. The experience whisks you away to a bygone era." The tavern currently has seven dining rooms, two of which are upstairs, with ninety seats and a full bar.

In 2012, Ye Olde Tavern was recognized as a "Green Restaurant" by the State of Vermont.

The Tavern's slogan is "Wining & Dining since 1790".

Gallery

References

  Living History in Vermont by Architectural Digest magazine
Hoffenberg, Noah,  "State's oldest tavern has new owners. Up at Breakfast owners take over 211-year-old tavern., Bennington Banner (VT), November 21, 2001. 
Wittemann, Betsy, and Webster, Nancy, Weekending in New England. (1993) page 266.
Blumenthal, Ralph, Weekend excursions; to schuss, to shop., The New York Times, January 21, 2000.  Retrieved August 19, 2009.
Foulds, Diane, "Colonial comfort.", The Boston Globe, February 3, 2003. Retrieved August 19, 2009.
"New England's early inns recall life in the colonies," The Chicago Tribune, March 13, 1966, mentions the Thayer Hotel.
"The quality of Manchester.", Historicalpages.com. Retrieved August 19, 2009
 The American Local History Network 
 Historic Inns and Taverns of New England
 See New England
 A Vermont Green Business since 2012.
 Best Steakhouses in each State
 Oldest Bar in Vermont.
 Recognition by the Manchester Business Journal

External links

Restaurants in Vermont
Buildings and structures in Manchester, Vermont
Restaurants established in 1790
1790 establishments in Vermont